An illusion is a distortion of the senses, which can reveal how the mind normally organizes and interprets sensory stimulation. Although illusions distort the human perception of reality, they are generally shared by most people.

Illusions may occur with any of the human senses, but visual illusions (optical illusions) are the best-known and understood. The emphasis on visual illusions occurs because vision often dominates the other senses. For example, individuals watching a ventriloquist will perceive the voice is coming from the dummy since they are able to see the dummy mouth the words.

Some illusions are based on general assumptions the brain makes during perception. These assumptions are made using organizational principles (e.g., Gestalt theory), an individual's capacity for depth perception and motion perception, and perceptual constancy. Other illusions occur because of biological sensory structures within the human body or conditions outside the body within one's physical environment.

The term illusion refers to a specific form of sensory distortion. Unlike a hallucination, which is a distortion in the absence of a stimulus, an illusion describes a misinterpretation of a true sensation. For example, hearing voices regardless of the environment would be a hallucination, whereas hearing voices in the sound of running water (or another auditory source) would be an illusion.

Visual

A visual illusion or optical illusion is characterized by visually perceived images that are deceptive or misleading. Therefore, the information gathered by the visual sense is processed to give, on the face of it, a percept that does not tally with information from other senses or physical measurement. A conventional assumption is that there are physiological illusions that occur naturally and cognitive illusions that can be demonstrated by specific visual tricks  that say something more basic about how human perceptual systems work. The visual system (eye and brain) constructs a world inside our head  based on what it samples from the surrounding environment. However, sometimes it tries to organize this information "it thinks best" while other times it fills in the gaps. This way in which our brain works is the basis of an illusion.

Auditory

An auditory illusion is an illusion of hearing, the auditory equivalent of a visual illusion: the listener hears either sound which are not present in the stimulus, or "impossible" sounds. In short, audio illusions highlight areas where the human ear and brain, as organic, makeshift tools, differ from perfect audio receptors (for better or for worse). One example of an auditory illusion is a Shepard tone.

Tactile

Examples of tactile illusions include phantom limb, the thermal grill illusion, the cutaneous rabbit illusion and a curious illusion that occurs when the crossed index and middle fingers are run along the bridge of the nose with one finger on each side, resulting in the perception of two separate noses. The brain areas activated during illusory tactile perception are similar to those activated during actual tactile stimulation. Tactile illusions can also be elicited through haptic technology. These "illusory" tactile objects can be used to create "virtual objects".

Temporal

A temporal illusion is a distortion in the perception of time, which occurs when the time interval between two or more events is very narrow (typically less than a second). In such cases, a person may momentarily perceive time as slowing down, stopping, speeding up, or running backward.

Intersensory
Illusions can occur with the other senses including those involved in food perception. Both sound and touch have been shown to modulate the perceived staleness and crispness of food products. It was also discovered that even if some portion of the taste receptor on the tongue became damaged that illusory taste could be produced by tactile stimulation. Evidence of olfactory (smell) illusions occurred when positive or negative verbal labels were given prior to olfactory stimulation. The McGurk effect shows that what we hear is influenced by what we see as we hear the person speaking; when the auditory component of one sound is paired with the visual component of another sound, leading to the perception of a third sound.

Disorders
Some illusions occur as a result of an illness or a disorder. While these types of illusions are not shared with everyone, they are typical of each condition. For example, migraine sufferers often report fortification illusions.

Neuroscience
Perception is linked to specific brain activity and so can be elicited by brain stimulation. The (illusory) percepts that can be evoked range from simple phosphenes (detections of lights in the visual field) to high-level percepts. In a single-case study on a patient undergoing presurgical evaluation for epilepsy treatment, electrical stimulation at the left temporo-parietal junction evoked the percept of a nearby (illusory) person who "closely 'shadowed' changes in the patient's body position and posture".

See also
.
.
.

.
.
.

Hallucination – A vivid perception in the absence of external stimulus that has qualities of real perceptions.
.
.
.
.
.
.

References

External links

Universal Veiling Techniques 
What is an Illusion? by J.R. Block.
Optical illusions and visual phenomena by Michael Bach
Auditory illusions
Haptic Perception of Shape - touch illusions, forces and the geometry of objects, by Gabriel Robles-De-La-Torre.
Silencing awareness of visual change by motion 

 
Reality
Perception
Deception
Articles containing video clips